The 1992 CFL season is considered to be the 39th season in modern-day Canadian football, although it is officially the 35th Canadian Football League season.

CFL News in 1992
The CFL celebrated 100 years of football in Canada, commemorating the formation of the Canadian Rugby Union in 1892, the forerunner of Football Canada and the CFL. Former Alouette running back/tight end, Larry Smith was named as the ninth CFL Commissioner in history on Thursday, February 27.

The Calgary Stampeders then owned by Larry Ryckman, signed free agent quarterback, Doug Flutie in March. The CFL revoked the franchise of BC Lions owner Murray Pezim and assumed control of the team, when Pezim refused to pay off club bills, on August 27. After one month, Bill Comrie purchased the BC Lions franchise from the CFL on September 23.

At the CFL Awards, Doug Flutie was named as the CFL's Most Outstanding Player for the second straight season, only becoming the third player to do so. Toronto played host to the Grey Cup for the 45th time, which is more than any other city. In addition, the Calgary Stampeders won their first Grey Cup championship in 21 years; ending the longest drought at that time of any CFL city, by defeating the Winnipeg Blue Bombers, 24–10.

In June 1992, the CFL played a preseason game between Toronto and Calgary in Portland, Oregon. It was a predecessor to the CFL USA expansion that would begin the next year.

Regular season standings

Final regular season standings
Note: GP = Games Played, W = Wins, L = Losses, T = Ties, PF = Points For, PA = Points Against, Pts = Points

Bold text means that they have clinched the playoffs.
Calgary and Winnipeg get first round byes.

Grey Cup playoffs

The Calgary Stampeders are the 1992 Grey Cup champions, defeating the Winnipeg Blue Bombers 24–10, at Toronto's SkyDome.  This was the first championship for the Stampeders in 21 years, ending the longest existing drought at the time, having previously won the 1971 Grey Cup Game over the Toronto Argonauts. Incidentally, the Saskatchewan Roughriders ended a 23-year drought several years earlier with a win in the 1989 Grey Cup Game, which was played at the same venue as the 1992 game. The Stampeders' Doug Flutie (QB) was named the Grey Cup's Most Valuable Player and Dave Sapunjis (SB) was the Grey Cup's Most Valuable Canadian.

Playoff bracket

CFL Leaders
 CFL Passing Leaders
 CFL Rushing Leaders
 CFL Receiving Leaders

1992 CFL All-Stars

Offence
QB – Doug Flutie, Calgary Stampeders
FB – Blake Marshall, Edmonton Eskimos
RB – Mike Richardson, Winnipeg Blue Bombers
SB – Ray Elgaard, Saskatchewan Roughriders
SB – Allen Pitts, Calgary Stampeders
WR – Stephen Jones, Ottawa Rough Riders
WR – Jim Sandusky, Edmonton Eskimos
C – Rod Connop, Edmonton Eskimos
OG – Pierre Vercheval, Edmonton Eskimos
OG – Rocco Romano, Calgary Stampeders
OT – Robert Smith, Ottawa Rough Riders
OT – Vic Stevenson, Saskatchewan Roughriders

Defence
DT – Rodney Harding, Toronto Argonauts
DT – Jearld Baylis, Saskatchewan Roughriders
DE – Will Johnson, Calgary Stampeders
DE – Bobby Jurasin, Saskatchewan Roughriders
LB – Angelo Snipes, Ottawa Rough Riders
LB – Willie Pless, Edmonton Eskimos
LB – John Motton, Hamilton Tiger-Cats
CB – Less Browne, Ottawa Rough Riders
CB – Junior Thurman, Calgary Stampeders
DB – Anthony Drawhorn, Ottawa Rough Riders
DB – Darryl Hall, Calgary Stampeders
DS – Glen Suitor, Saskatchewan Roughriders

Special teams
P – Hank Ilesic, Toronto Argonauts
K – Troy Westwood, Winnipeg Blue Bombers
ST – Henry "Gizmo" Williams, Edmonton Eskimos

1992 Eastern All-Stars

Offence
QB – Tom Burgess, Ottawa Rough Riders
FB – Warren Hudson, Winnipeg Blue Bombers
RB – Mike Richardson, Winnipeg Blue Bombers
SB – Rob Crifo, Winnipeg Blue Bombers
SB – Ken Evraire, Hamilton Tiger-Cats
WR – Stephen Jones, Ottawa Rough Riders
WR – Larry Thompson, Winnipeg Blue Bombers
C – Irv Daymond, Ottawa Rough Riders
OG – Dan Ferrone, Toronto Argonauts
OG – Jason Riley, Hamilton Tiger-Cats
OT – Robert Smith, Ottawa Rough Riders
OT – Chris Walby, Winnipeg Blue Bombers

Defence
DT – Rodney Harding, Toronto Argonauts
DT – Jeff Fields, Hamilton Tiger-Cats
DE – John Kropke, Ottawa Rough Riders
DE – Mike Campbell, Toronto Argonauts
LB – Angelo Snipes, Ottawa Rough Riders
LB – Greg Stumon, Ottawa Rough Riders
LB – John Motton, Hamilton Tiger-Cats
CB – Less Browne, Ottawa Rough Riders
CB – Rod Hill, Winnipeg Blue Bombers
DB – Anthony Drawhorn, Ottawa Rough Riders
DB – Don Wilson, Toronto Argonauts
DS – Todd Wiseman, Hamilton Tiger-Cats

Special teams
P – Hank Ilesic, Toronto Argonauts
K – Troy Westwood, Winnipeg Blue Bombers
ST – Raghib Ismail, Toronto Argonauts

1992 Western All-Stars

Offence
QB – Doug Flutie, Calgary Stampeders
FB – Blake Marshall, Edmonton Eskimos
RB – Jon Volpe, BC Lions
SB – Ray Elgaard, Saskatchewan Roughriders
SB – Allen Pitts, Calgary Stampeders
WR – Darren Flutie, BC Lions
WR – Jim Sandusky, Edmonton Eskimos
C – Rod Connop, Edmonton Eskimos
OG – Pierre Vercheval, Edmonton Eskimos
OG – Rocco Romano, Calgary Stampeders
OT – Jim Mills, BC Lions
OT – Vic Stevenson, Saskatchewan Roughriders

Defence
DT – Jerald Baylis, Saskatchewan Roughriders
DT – Lloyd Lewis, Edmonton Eskimos
DE – Will Johnson, Calgary Stampeders
DE – Bobby Jurasin, Saskatchewan Roughriders
LB – Alondra Johnson, Calgary Stampeders
LB – Willie Pless, Edmonton Eskimos
LB – Matt Finlay, Calgary Stampeders
CB – Damion Lyons, Edmonton Eskimos
CB – Junior Thurman, Calgary Stampeders
DB – Enis Jackson, Edmonton Eskimos
DB – Darryl Hall, Calgary Stampeders
DS – Glen Suitor, Saskatchewan Roughriders

Special teams
P – Lui Passaglia, BC Lions
K – Mark McLoughlin, Calgary Stampeders
ST – Henry "Gizmo" Williams, Edmonton Eskimos

1992 CFL Awards
CFL's Most Outstanding Player Award – Doug Flutie (QB), Calgary Stampeders
CFL's Most Outstanding Canadian Award – Ray Elgaard (SB), Saskatchewan Roughriders
CFL's Most Outstanding Defensive Player Award – Willie Pless (LB), Edmonton Eskimos
CFL's Most Outstanding Offensive Lineman Award – Robert Smith (OT), Ottawa Rough Riders
CFL's Most Outstanding Rookie Award – Mike Richardson (RB), Winnipeg Blue Bombers
CFLPA's Outstanding Community Service Award – Danny Barrett (QB), BC Lions
CFL's Coach of the Year – Wally Buono, Calgary Stampeders
Commissioner's Award - Tom Shepherd, Saskatchewan Roughriders

References 

CFL
Canadian Football League seasons